Florence Dadson (born 23 April 1992) is a Ghanaian female footballer, who currently plays for the Gulf Coast Texans in the United States.

Club career 
Dadson started her career in the Academy of Christ the King and joined Ghatel Ladies Cape Coast at age thirteen. She left her homeland, Ghana, in September 2011 after she gained admission to the Robert Morris University in Illinois to pursue her undergraduate studies in Business Administration – Majoring in Tourism Studies. She played for RMU alongside Ghanaian team members Olivia Amoako and Linda Eshun.

After graduating from Robert Morris University in the Spring of 2014, she joined to W-League club Gulf Coast Texans.

International career 
Dadson played as a forward and has represented her country at both U-17 and U-20 levels. Dadson played for Ghana at the 2008 FIFA U-17 Women's World Cup and 2012 FIFA U-20 Women's World Cup. She stands also in the extended squad of the Black Queens.

Personal life 
Dadson married Ghanaian international footballer David Accam on 3 January 2019 in Cape Coast, Ghana.

Honours 
Ghana

 Africa Women Cup of Nations : Third-place 2016

References 

1992 births
Living people
Expatriate women's soccer players in the United States
Ghanaian expatriate footballers
Ghanaian expatriate sportspeople in the United States
Ghanaian expatriate women's footballers
Ghanaian women's footballers
People from Cape Coast
Robert Morris University Illinois alumni
Women's association football forwards